John Gray (born June 9, 1913, in Kelso, Scotland; died April 1, 2000) was a Scottish mythologist and author of books about the religion, mythology and the culture of ancient Mesopotamia and the Near East. He was known for his 1969 book Near Eastern Mythology. He was also Professor of Hebrew and Semitic Languages at the University of Aberdeen until his retirement in 1980.

Bibliography
 I & II Kings: A Commentary, 1963
 The Krt Text in the Literature of Ras Shamra: A Social Myth of Ancient Canaan, 1964
 Near Eastern Mythology : Mesopotamia, Syria, Palestine, 1969
 A History of Jerusalem, 1969
 What About the Children?, 1970
 The Biblical Doctrine of the Reign of God, 1979
 Joshua, Judges, Ruth, The New Century Bible Commentary, 1986

References

1913 births
2000 deaths
Mythographers
American historians of religion
Historians of Jews and Judaism
Historians of Israel
American male non-fiction writers
20th-century American male writers
People from Kelso, Scottish Borders